Sobhan Babu (born Uppu Sobhana Chalapathi Rao; 14 January 1937 – 20 March 2008) was an Indian actor known for his works in Telugu cinema. He made his film debut in Bhakta Sabari (1959), but Daiva Balam (1959) released earlier. He garnered four Filmfare Awards South for Best Actor, and Special Jury Award for Bangaru Panjaram (1969) at the 4th IFFI. Sobhan Babu was featured in National Award winning films such as Sita Rama Kalyanam (1961), Mahamantri Timmarusu (1962), Lava Kusa (1963), Nartanasala (1963), featured at the 3rd Afro-Asian Film Festival, and Desamante Manushuloyi (1970). He is often referred to as Nata Bushana.

In a film career as a matinee idol, spanning more than thirty five years, Sobhan Babu starred in more than 200 feature films in a variety of roles in films such as Veerabhimanyu (1965), Manushulu Marali (1969), Tara Sasankam (1969), Kalyana Mandapam (1971), Chelleli Kapuram (1971), Sampoorna Ramayanam (1972), Sarada (1973), Manchi Manushulu (1974), Jeevana Jyothi (1975), Soggadu (1976), Kurukshetram (1977), Mallepoovu (1978), Gorintaku (1979), Karthika Deepam, (1979), Mosagadu (1980), Devatha (1982), and Mundadugu (1983).

Background
Sobhanbabu was born to Uppu Suryanarayanarao and had four siblings, three sisters, Dhanaranga, Jhansi and Nirmala, and a brother, Sambasivarao. Sobhanbabu completed his initial schooling at Kuntamukkula, Mylavaram. He pursued his Intermediate in Krishna District. He completed B.Sc degree in Physics at Andhra Christian College, Guntur. After that he opted for a Law degree in Madras to pursue his cinema career.

Personal life
He married Santhakumari on May 15, 1958. They had three daughters, and a son Karunasesh. He never introduced his son into film industry and he made him a successful businessman. He enjoyed a peaceful family life. Shoban Babu and kV.chalam were best friends till kV chalam death.after that he shared a close friendship with Chandramohan until his last breath.he also helped his workers (driver, chefs etc) financially and settled them well. It is also rumored that he also maintained a close relationship with actress and former Tamilnadu chief minister "Jayalalitha". He also used to give valuable suggestions to film actors regarding buying assets and investments. Actor Murali Mohan followed his suggestions and settled well.

Death

On 20 March 2008,aged 71. Shobanbabu after completing yoga he freshned up and sat on his favourite "rocking chair" reading newspaper and waiting for breakfast. suddenly he suffered  massive heart attack and fell down from his chair and injured his nose. Immediately family members rushed him to hospital and he was pronounced dead. tollywood, and, Kollywood stars paid homage to him whole film fraternity mourned his death.he was cremated at his own farm in chennai.<ref name="auto1"

Awards
Filmfare Awards South
Filmfare Award for Best Actor – Telugu – Khaidi Baabayi (1974)
Filmfare Award for Best Actor – Telugu – Jeevana Jyothi (1975)
Filmfare Award for Best Actor – Telugu - Soggadu (1976)
Filmfare Award for Best Actor – Telugu - Karthika Deepam (1979)

Filmography

References

External links
 

1937 births
2008 deaths
Male actors in Telugu cinema
Indian male film actors
Telugu people
Filmfare Awards South winners
Nandi Award winners
Male actors from Andhra Pradesh
People from Krishna district
20th-century Indian male actors